Larry A. Ryle High School is a public secondary school located in Union, Kentucky, USA. The school's Mascot is the Raiders.

History 
Founded in 1992, it is one of four high schools (Boone County, Conner, Ryle, and Cooper) in the Boone County School District. The school was named in honor of Larry A. Ryle, a former superintendent, administrator, and teacher. Historically the school's main rival has been Boone County; other major rivals include Cooper, Conner, and Simon Kenton.

Hostage incident 
On May 26, 1994, after shooting and killing his family at home, a 17-year-old student held his classroom hostage at gunpoint for 30 minutes before releasing them and surrendering to the police, after being persuaded to do so by vice principal Steve Sorrell. The student was sentenced to 25 years to life. His first parole attempt was denied in 2019, and he is not eligible to apply for parole again until 2029.

Academics 
According to the 2017 U.S. News & World Report, Ryle was unranked nationally. As of 2017, the school earned a 49.0 on the college readiness index. The school had a 50% mathematics proficiency rating and a 72% English proficiency rating. 58% of the school was AP tested, and 72% scored a 3 or higher on their AP exams.

Ryle offers Advanced Placement courses, including classes in American history, European history, government, art, chemistry, biology, calculus, computer science, English language and literature, physics, psychology, and others. The school also offers honors courses, with the intent of challenging students and preparing them for post-secondary education.

Sports

Baseball

Ryle's 2007 and 2013 baseball teams won the Regional Championship.  The 2007 team compiled a record of 34–7.  The 2013 team had a record of 35–4.

Boys' Basketball

The Ryle Raider boys' 2002 basketball team won Districts and the 9th Region tournament to gain a place in the Sweet 16 at Rupp Arena. For the first time in school history the boys' basketball team made it to Lexington to battle for the State Championship. The Raiders didn't return with a state championship, but did have a record breaking season.

Girls' Basketball
The Ryle Lady Raiders won the program's first Regional Championship in 2018 and made it to the KHSAA Elite 8.  In the 2018–19 season the Lady Raiders finished the season with a 33–5 record (Program Record), winning The State Farm Holiday Classic and the Louisville Invitational Tournament.  On February, 22nd 2019 Ryle defeated Conner 62-59 giving the Lady Raiders the 33rd District Championship.  On March, 4th 2019 Ryle defeated Dixie Heights 67-51 securing their 2nd consecutive 9th Region Championship.   On March 17, 2019, the Ryle Lady Raiders defeated Southwestern 63–48, giving the Lady Raiders their first State Championship in the program's history. They were well on their way to repeating in 2020 if the tournament hadn't been cancelled due to COVID-19.

Boys' Cross Country 
The Ryle Raider boys' 2014 cross country team placed 10th in the KHSAA Class 3A State Cross Country Championship, the highest in the school's history.

Softball

Ryle's Fast Pitch Softball team won the State Championship in 2006, were State Runners-Up in 2007, came in 4th in 2008 and came in 7th in 2010.

Soccer

State Runners-up in 2006, losing the championship game to Bowling Green.

State Runners-up in 2011, losing the championship game to St. Xavier High School (Louisville).

Regional Champions and State semi-finalists in 2017.

Football

State runners-up in 2006. They lost the final game to Trinity High School (Louisville).

Wrestling

 3X State Runner-up: 2005, 2008, 2010
 2X Kentucky State Duals Runner-up 2003, 2005
 8X Regional Champions 2002, 2005, 2006, 2007, 2008, 2009, 2010, 2011
 3X Regional Runner-up 2001, 2003, 2004
 3X Northern Kentucky Athletic Conference Champions 2000, 2001, 2006
 9 straight top 10 finishes in the KHSAA State Tournament 2002-2010
 13 State Champions
 12 State Runners-up
 70 State Placers
 58 Regional Champions
 5 Div I Collegiate Athletes

Marching Band
In 2017, under the direction of Joe Craig, the Marching Raiders participated in the Kentucky State Marching Band Championships with their show "The Rising"; a fitting name given that they would make two of the next three championships, placing 3rd by 1 point with "City of Dreams" in 2019, and 4th with "Emergence" in 2021. As well as their 2022 show entitled "In Absentia" receiving another 3rd place in the 2022 32nd Annual Kentucky State Marching Band Championships.

Notable alumni
 Justin Doellman - Professional basketball player in Europe; 2014 MVP of the Spanish ACB
 Josh Hutcherson - Actor
 Tanner Morgan - College football quarterback, University of Minnesota

See also
Boone County Schools
Cooper High School
Boone County High School
Conner High School

References

External links
 Larry A. Ryle High School Homepage
 Boone County Schools

Public high schools in Kentucky
Schools in Boone County, Kentucky
Educational institutions established in 1992
1992 establishments in Kentucky
Union, Kentucky